Martha Gonzalez is a Chicana artist, activist, musician and feminist music theorist. She is an associate professor in the Intercollegiate Department of Chicana/o Latina/o Studies at Scripps College.  She is also a lead singer, percussionist, and songwriter for the band Quetzal, which won a Grammy Award for Best Latin Pop, Rock or Album in 2013. In 2022, Gonzalez was named a MacArthur Fellow by the MacArthur Foundation.

Academic career

Gonzalez holds a PhD degree in Gender, Women & Sexuality Studies from the University of Washington and a BA in Ethnomusicology from the University of California, Los Angeles. She was a Fulbright Garcia-Robles Scholar (2007–2008), a Ford Foundation Dissertation Fellow (2012–2013), and a Woodrow Wilson Career Enhancement Fellow (2016–2017). In September 2016, Gonzalez began a three-year artist-in-residence program at Arizona State University in Phoenix/Tempe.

Musical career
Gonzalez is a singer/songwriter and percussionist for the Chicano rock band Quetzal. Gonzalez also performs with the band FandangOban. In addition, Gonzalez and her partner Quetzal Flores have played a key role in connecting Chican@/Latin@ communities in the U.S and Jarocho communities in Veracruz, Mexico. In September 2011, the U.S. Library of Congress and Kennedy Center invited Gonzalez to perform and speak as a part of their "Homegrown" music series. 

Gonzalez has collaborated musically and/or toured with numerous artists, including Los Lobos, Los Van Van, Jackson Browne, Susana Baca, Perla Batalla, Jaguares, Ozomatli, Jonathan Richman, Los Muñequitos de Matanzas, ¡Cubanismo!, Taj Mahal, Tom Waits, Los Super Seven, Lila Downs, Raul Malo, Rick Trevino, Son de Madera, Relicario, Chuchumbe Charanga Cakewalk, B-Side Players, Teatro Campesino and Laura Rebolloso. 

In the summer of 2014, Gonzalez’s tarima (stomp box) and zapateado shoes were acquired by the National Museum of American History.

Artivism

Gonzalez trains other local Los Angeles-based artists in the Collective Songwriting method, and she works with The Alliance for California Traditional Arts (ACTA) on implementing the method.

Awards 

In 2022, Gonzalez was named a MacArthur Fellow by the MacArthur Foundation.

Personal life
Gonzalez is the middle of four children, born in Los Angeles to parents who had immigrated from Guadalajara, Jalisco, Mexico. Gonzalez and her siblings grew up singing in downtown Los Angeles. She is married to her Quetzal bandmate Quetzal Flores, and they have a son together.

Selected research and publications

2014: “Creating a Mexican-AfroCuban American Beat” in What It Means to be American
2014: “Mixing in the Kitchen: Entre Mujeres Feminine Translocal Composition” in Performing Motherhood, Demeter Press, ISBN 978-1-927335-92-5
2014:: A de activista, Triangle Square, ISBN 978-1609805692
2015: “Sobreviviendo: Immigration Stories and Testimonio in Song” Center for Latino Research at University of De Paul University.
2020: Chican@ Artivistas: Music, Community, and Transborder Tactics in East Los Angeles, University of Texas Press, ISBN 978-1-4773-2113-3

References

External links
Quetzal Band
Mujeres de Maiz homepage
Women Who Rock homepage

Year of birth missing (living people)
Living people
Chicana feminists
1970s births
Feminist musicians
Musicians from Los Angeles
University of Washington alumni
University of California, Los Angeles alumni
MacArthur Fellows